François Darlan (1881-1942) was a French admiral and political figure.

Darlan may also refer to:

Given name
 Darlan Cunha (born 1985), Brazilian actor
 Darlan Romani (born 1991), Brazilian shot putter
 Darlan (footballer, born 1994), Darlan Bispo Damasceno, Brazilian football midfielder for Louletano
 Darlan (footballer, born 1998), Darlan Pereira Mendes, Brazilian football midfielder for Grêmio

Surname
 Jean-Baptiste Darlan (1848-1912), French politician and Minister of Justice
 Antoine Darlan (1915-1974), Central African politician and trade unionist
 Georges Darlan (1920-1965), Central African politician
 Éva Darlan (born 1948), French actress, director and producer

Other uses
 Darlan (horse) (2007-2013), British thoroughbred racehorse